Barren County is a county located in the south-central portion of the U.S. state of Kentucky. As of the 2020 census, the population was 44,485. Its county seat is Glasgow. The county was founded on December 20, 1798, from parts of Warren and Green Counties.  It was named for the Barrens, meadowlands that cover the northern third, though actually the soil is fertile. Barren County is part of the Glasgow, KY Micropolitan Statistical Area, which is also included in the Bowling Green-Glasgow, KY Combined Statistical Area. In 2007 Barren County was named the "Best Place to Live in Rural America" by Progressive Farmer Magazine.

History
Barren County was established in 1798 from land taken from Green County and Warren County. Six courthouses have served the county throughout its history, the first built of logs.

Barren County, like most of south-central Kentucky, was settled by the Scots-Irish, and still bears many cultural aspects that trace back to that heritage. The Scottish heritage is the most evident, as indicated by the name of the county seat, which is named for Glasgow, Scotland, and is celebrated annually with the Glasgow Highland Games, one of three highland games held each year in Kentucky.

Barren was a prohibition or dry county, until voters overturned that in September 2016. Prior to that, there were two exceptions:
 Cave City, which voted in 2005 to become "moist" (selling only alcohol by the drink in restaurants of a certain minimum size (100 in this case) and which derive 70% or more of their revenue from food), and later voted in 2014 to approve full package sales.
 Glasgow, which approved liquor by the drink under the same restrictions on November 6, 2007, after three previous elections to allow full alcohol sales in the city were soundly defeated.

Geography

Barren River Lake is located in the southern part of the county, forming part of its boundary with Allen County. Barren River Lake State Resort Park is located primarily within Barren County, along the lake's shoreline.

Adjacent counties
 Hart County  (north)
 Metcalfe County  (east)
 Monroe County  (southeast)
 Allen County  (southwest)
 Warren County  (west)
 Edmonson County  (northwest)

National protected area
 Mammoth Cave National Park (part)

Demographics

As of the census of 2000, there were 38,033 people, 15,346 households, and 10,941 families residing in the county. The racial makeup of the county was 94.30% White, 4.09% Black or African American, 0.15% Native American, 0.41% Asian, 0.03% Pacific Islander, 0.38% from other races, and 0.65% from two or more races.  0.93% of the population were Hispanic or Latino of any race.

There were 15,346 households, out of which 31.70% had children under the age of 18 living with them, 58.30% were married couples living together, 9.80% had a female householder with no husband present, and 28.70% were non-families. 25.60% of all households were made up of individuals, and 11.60% had someone living alone who was 65 years of age or older.  The average household size was 2.44 and the average family size was 2.91.

The age distribution was 24.20% under the age of 18, 8.20% from 18 to 24, 28.80% from 25 to 44, 23.80% from 45 to 64, and 15.00% who were 65 years of age or older.  The median age was 38 years. For every 100 females, there were 92.70 males.  For every 100 females age 18 and over, there were 89.30 males.

The median income for a household in the county was $31,240, and the median income for a family was $37,231. Males had a median income of $29,860 versus $21,208 for females. The per capita income for the county was $16,816.  About 11.80% of families and 15.60% of the population were below the poverty line, including 20.30% of those under age 18 and 19.10% of those age 65 or over.

Religion
Christianity is the predominant religion in the county. The Southern Baptist Convention is the leading Protestant denomination in terms of adherents, with Glasgow Baptist Church being the largest congregation in the county. Missionary Baptist, United Methodist, Free Methodist, Presbyterian (including Cumberland Presbyterian), Episcopalian, Disciples of Christ, Churches of Christ including non-institutional, Assemblies of God, and numerous independent churches are located in the county, as well as two Roman Catholic parishes, an LDS ward, and a sizable Amish community. No Jewish, Muslim, or other religions are known to have houses of worship within the county.

Economy
Barren County is primarily rural in nature, with agriculture as the primary industry. Glasgow, the county seat, has numerous manufacturing facilities, and is also a medical and retail hub for the area. Cave City is also a popular lodging area for tourists visiting nearby Mammoth Cave National Park.

Politics
Like Kentucky and most of the counties in the State, the Democratic Party has the most registered voters; however the county hasn't voted for the Democratic Presidential candidate since 1992—-and even then, it was by a margin of less than 2%. 51.57% of the voters are registered to the Democratic Party, and 41.73% are registered Republicans.

Voter registration

Statewide elections

Education
The county is home to all or part of three school districts:
 Most of the county is served by the Barren County Schools, which includes Barren County High School and Middle School in Glasgow, and seven elementary schools throughout the county, many of which were formerly also high schools before they were consolidated into Barren County High in the early 1970s.
 The Glasgow Independent Schools serve the city of Glasgow proper, with small areas of overlap outside the city limits. The district includes Glasgow High School, Glasgow Middle School, and two elementary schools. In addition, the Glasgow and Caverna (see below) districts jointly operate an alternative school located in the Glasgow district for "at-risk" children in middle and high school. Barren County High and Middle Schools, although operated by the county district, are actually located within the boundaries of the Glasgow district.
 The Caverna Independent Schools take in Cave City and surrounding northwest Barren County, as well as Horse Cave and the southwest corner of neighboring Hart County. It is served by Caverna High School, Caverna Middle School, and Caverna Elementary School, all located between Cave City and Horse Cave. The high school is on the Hart County side of the line, while the elementary and middle schools share a campus on the Barren County side. The district is one of only a handful in the United States which is located in more than one county. Three other districts with this distinction are in Kentucky, most notably the Corbin  Independent School District, serving a single city split by a county line.

Transportation
Barren County is served by Interstate 65, which goes through the northwest part of the county, and the Louie B. Nunn Cumberland Parkway, a former toll road that was designated to be part of the future Interstate 66 corridor before that project was scrapped. U.S. Routes 31E, 31W, and 68 also pass through the county.

Railroad service is provided by CSX Transportation, whose former Louisville and Nashville Railroad main line passes through Cave City and Park City. The Glasgow Railway Company is a short line which owns a branch from Park City (which was formerly called Glasgow Junction) to Glasgow; the line is serviced via an operating lease by CSX.

Communities

Cities
 Cave City
 Glasgow (county seat)
 Park City

Census-designated place
 Hiseville

Other unincorporated communities
 Apple Grove
 Austin
 Bear Wallow
 Beckton
 Bon Ayr
 Bristletown
 Cooktown
 Coral Hill
 Dry Fork
 Eighty Eight
 Etoile
 Finney
 Goodnight
 Griderville
 Haywood
 Highland Springs
 Kino
 Lecta
 Lucas
 Merry Oaks
 Nobob
 Oil City
 Park
 Peter Creek
 Pritchardsville
 Railton
 Rocky Hill
 Roseville
 Slick Rock
 Temple Hill
 Tracy

Media
 WLYE-FM "Willie 94.1" - Real Country Glasgow
 WCLU-AM 1490 Glasgow 
 WLLI "Willie 94.1" Glasgow (licensed to Munfordville)
 WCDS-AM 1230 "SportsRadio 123" - Newberry Broadcasting, Inc.
 W239BV (FM 95.7) - "96 Hits" - an analog radio repeater of WOVO-HD2/Horse Cave  
 Glasgow Daily Times - local newspaper published Tuesday through Saturday
 Barren County Progress - county-oriented weekly newspaper published Thursdays

Economy
Barren County's industry includes these companies:
 Walmart of Glasgow - Walmart operates a full-service super center at the intersection of Kentucky Route 90 (Happy Valley Road) and Veterans Outer Loop on the northwest outskirts of the city.
 Mid-State Recycling - the area's main recycling facility.
 Western Kentucky University's satellite campus in Glasgow, Kentucky
 Glasgow Electric Plant Board - Electric, cable television, and internet service in the City of Glasgow.
 Farmers Rural Electric Co Op - Electric service for the county.
 South Central Rural Telephone Company - cable television and internet service. 
 T.J. Samson Community Hospital
 Southern States Feed Mill in Park City
 Dakota Elmore Realty and Auction Co.

Cave City's main industry in Barren County's economy is tourism, thanks to its proximity to Mammoth Cave National Park, which is one of the top ten most visited attractions in Kentucky. A number of motels and restaurants are located at the interchange of Interstate 65 and state routes 70 and 90, which cater to tourists visiting the area or just passing through, thereby making Cave City, and much of northwest Barren County, a tourism hot-spot. The city operates a small convention center that is popular with church groups and other family-related organizations, mainly because of the area's lack of crime and abundance of tourist attractions. Cave City has long been a gateway to Mammoth Cave; in the era of passenger rail travel, trains of the Louisville and Nashville Railroad would discharge tourists there, who would then be shuttled to the cave. The agricultural industry is also a big factor in the area's economy. For more information, see the Barren County Economic Authority's website (www.BarrenCoEa.com).

Sites and events of interest
 Fort Williams, Glasgow.
 Barren River Lake State Resort Park, Lucas at the junction of US 31E and KY 87 in southern Barren County.
 Barren River Lake, a lake along the Barren-Allen County line that is operated by the U.S. Army Corps of Engineers.  
 Kentucky Action Park/Jesse James Riding Stables, Cave City, Kentucky
 Guntown Mountain Old West town and Haunted Hotel, Cave City
 Diamond Caverns, Park City, along the Edmonson-Barren County line on the southeastern fringe of Mammoth Cave National Park.
 Onyx Cave and Rock Shop, Cave City
 Thomerson Park, Dry Fork

Events include, but are not limited to, the following:
 The 400-mile yard sale along US 68 throughout the route's course in Kentucky (except Metro Lexington and the LBL) - first Thursday-Sunday in June, annually.
 Glasgow Highland Games at Barren River Lake State Resort Park - early June.
 Annual Roller Coaster Yard Sale along State Highway 63 - early October.
 Annual Fireworks Extravaganza at Barren River Lake, July 4 of each year.

Notable people

 Walter Arnold Baker (1937-2010) :  Associate Justice, Kentucky Supreme Court, Assistant General Counsel for International Affairs in the Department of Defense, Member of Kentucky Senate and House of Representatives, Lieutenant Colonel, Kentucky Air National Guard. 
 Ira F. M. Butler (1812–1909), Oregon pioneer and state legislator
 Floyd Collins (1887–1925), cave explorer and cave accident victim
 Kelly Craft (née Guilfoil) (born 1962), US Ambassador to the United Nations and US Ambassador to Canada
 Nancy Kelsey (1823–1896), the "Betsy Ross of California
 Louie B. Nunn (1924–2004), former governor of Kentucky 
 Marion McCarrell Scott (1843-1922), educator and government advisor in Meiji period Japan 
 Henry Skaggs (1724-1810), longhunter, explorer, and pioneer, lived in Hiseville
 Luska Twyman (1913–1988), first African American mayor of Glasgow, Kentucky
 William Burton Walbert (1886–1959), Southern gospel songwriter, singer, composer, and editor

See also

 National Register of Historic Places listings in Barren County, Kentucky

References

External links
 Mammoth Fun - Kentucky's Cave Country (Caveland Marketing Association)

 
1798 establishments in Kentucky
Kentucky counties
Glasgow, Kentucky, micropolitan area
Populated places established in 1798